Oliver Twist is a lost 1916 silent film drama produced by Jesse Lasky and distributed by Paramount Pictures. It was directed by James Young. It is based on the famous 1838 novel, Oliver Twist, by Charles Dickens and the 1912 Broadway stage version of the novel.

Marie Doro had played Oliver on Broadway in 1912 to much acclaim and was brought in by Lasky to reprise her role in this film. In fact, the main reason this film was made was to showcase Doro rather than Dickens. In the play, the parts of Nancy, Fagin and Bill Sykes were played by Constance Collier, Nat C. Goodwin and Lyn Harding respectively. Elsie Jane Wilson who had a supporting part in the play is Nancy in the film. Wilson and Doro are the only players from the play to appear in this film.

Four film versions had been made prior to this film: in 1907, 1909 and two in 1912, the year of Doro's stage success. A later 1922 silent version starred Lon Chaney and Jackie Coogan.

Plot summary

Cast
 Marie Doro - Oliver Twist
 Tully Marshall - Fagin
 Hobart Bosworth - Bill Sykes
 Raymond Hatton - Jack Hawkins, "The Artful Dodger"
 James Neill - Mr. Brownlow
 Edythe Chapman - Mrs. Brownlow
 Elsie Jane Wilson - Nancy
 Harry Rattenbury - Mr. Bumble
 Carl Stockdale - Monks
 W. S. Van Dyke - Charles Dickens

References

External links
 
 allmovie/synopsis
 
 
 still from the film left to right: ''Marie Doro, Tully Marshall, Hobart Bosworth, Raymond Hatton

American silent feature films
Films based on Oliver Twist
Films directed by James Young
Lost American films
American black-and-white films
Films set in London
1916 films
1910s historical drama films
American historical drama films
Paramount Pictures films
1916 drama films
1910s American films
Silent American drama films
Silent historical drama films
1910s English-language films